Wang Yong (born 29 January 1979 in Shanghai) is a male Chinese water polo player who was part of the gold medal-winning team at the 2006 Asian Games. He competed at the 2008 Summer Olympics.

References
 profile

1979 births
Living people
Chinese male water polo players
Olympic water polo players of China
Sportspeople from Shanghai
Water polo players at the 2008 Summer Olympics
Asian Games medalists in water polo
Water polo players at the 2002 Asian Games
Water polo players at the 2006 Asian Games
Medalists at the 2002 Asian Games
Medalists at the 2006 Asian Games
Asian Games gold medalists for China
Asian Games bronze medalists for China
21st-century Chinese people